The 1959 SMU Mustangs football team represented Southern Methodist University (SMU) as a member of the Southwest Conference (SWC) during the 1959 NCAA University Division football season. Led by third-year head coach Bill Meek, the Mustangs compiled an overall record of 5–4–1 with a conference mark of 2–3–1, placing fifth in the SWC. SMU's offense scored 147 points while the defense allowed 133 points.

Schedule

Roster

Team players drafted into the NFL

References

SMU
SMU Mustangs football seasons
SMU Mustangs football